Taves is a surname. Notable people with the surname include:

Ann Taves (born 1952), American religious studies scholar
Ernest H. Taves (1916–2003), American psychiatrist and UFO skeptic
Josh Taves (born 1972), American football player